Malesiathrips is a genus of thrips in the family Phlaeothripidae. Species of the genus are found in Malaysia, Guam, Solomon Islands and northern Queensland, Australia.

Species
 Malesiathrips australis
 Malesiathrips guamensis
 Malesiathrips malayensis
 Malesiathrips solomoni

References

External links
Malesiathrips: description from a Lucid key

Phlaeothripidae
Thrips
Thrips genera